Charles Louis, Hereditary Prince of Baden (14 February 1755 – 16 December 1801) was heir apparent of the Margraviate of Baden.

Early life and family
Born in Karlsruhe, he was the son of Margrave Charles Frederick (who in 1803, after Charles Louis's death, became the elector and in 1806 the first Grand Duke of Baden) and Landgravine Caroline Louise of Hesse-Darmstadt (11 July 1723 - 8 April 1783), the daughter of Landgrave Louis VIII of Hesse-Darmstadt.

He was an ancestor of Franz Joseph I of Austria, Elisabeth of Austria-Hungary, Nicholas II of Russia and his wife, Alexandra Feodorovna (Alix of Hesse), Lord Mountbatten, Prince Philip, Duke of Edinburgh, and Charles III of the United Kingdom, among others.

Marriage and issue
On 15 July 1774, Charles Louis married his first cousin Landgravine Amalie of Hesse-Darmstadt (20 June 1754 – 21 July 1832). She was the daughter of Louis IX, Landgrave of Hesse-Darmstadt.

They had eight children:

 Princess Amalie of Baden (13 July 1776 – 26 October 1823)
 Princess Karoline of Baden (13 July 1776 – 13 November 1841); married on 9 March 1797 the then Count Palatine Maximilian of Zweibrücken (27 May 1756 – 13 October 1825), as his second wife (and became maternal grandmother of Empress Sisi and her husband, Franz Joseph I of Austria). In 1799 her husband became Elector Palatine and Elector of Bavaria, and in 1804 King of Bavaria (her titles accordingly being Duchess, then Electress, then Queen).
 Princess Louise of Baden (24 January 1779 – 16 May 1826); married on 9 October 1793 Tsar Alexander I of Russia (23 December 1777 – 1 December 1825).
 Princess Frederica of Baden (12 March 1781 – 25 September 1826); married on 31 October 1797 Gustav IV Adolf of Sweden. They divorced in 1812.
 Princess Marie of Baden (7 September 1782 – 29 April 1808); married on 1 November 1802 Frederick William, Duke of Brunswick (9 October 1771 – 16 June 1815).
 Prince Charles Frederick of Baden (13 September 1784 – 1 March 1785); died prior to succeeding.
 Charles, Grand Duke of Baden (8 June 1786 in Karlsruhe – 8 December 1818 in Rastatt); married on 8 April 1806 Stéphanie de Beauharnais (28 August 1789 – 29 January 1860). Among his descendants are the royal families of Belgium, Romania, Yugoslavia, Luxembourg, Monaco, and two branches of the House of Habsburg.
 Princess Wilhelmine of Baden (10 September 1788 – 27 January 1836); married on 19 June 1804 her double first cousin Ludwig II, Grand Duke of Hesse and by Rhine (26 December 1777 – 16 June 1848), and was mother of Empress Maria Alexandrovna as well as great-grandmother of both Nicholas II of Russia and his wife, Empress Alexandra Feodorovna.

Works of history mention that his children succeeded well in marriage market and that the Hereditary Prince was the force behind that. At the time of his death in Arboga, Sweden (which occurred during the visit to his fourth daughter, the Queen of Sweden), two of his other daughters were, respectively, Electress of Bavaria and the newly ascended Empress of Russia.

Ancestry

References 

Heirs apparent who never acceded
House of Zähringen
1755 births
1801 deaths
Hereditary Princes of Baden
Nobility from Karlsruhe
Sons of monarchs